Strandings of sperm whales have occurred across much of their global range. About 60 per cent of the world's recorded sperm whale strandings occur in three regions – Tasmania, New Zealand and the North Sea. 132 strandings of sperm whales were recorded around the coast of the United Kingdom (mostly in Scotland) between 1990 and 2011. The list below is in reverse chronological order and is not exhaustive. Possible causes of stranding events are mostly speculative and are not reflected in this list.

List

References 

Cetacean-related lists
 
Environment-related lists